Karleigh Anthony Jonathan Osborne (born 19 March 1988) is an English football manager and former professional footballer who is the head coach of Brentford Women.

As a player, Osborne was a central defender and made over 160 Football League appearances for Brentford between 2005 and 2012. In his subsequent nomadic Football League career, he played for Millwall, Bristol City, Colchester United, AFC Wimbledon, Plymouth Argyle and Grimsby Town. Osborne also played in the Scottish Premiership for Kilmarnock and in non-League football for Hayes, Oxford United, Eastbourne Borough, Aldershot Town and Braintree Town.

Club career

Brentford

Early years (2004–2006) 
A central defender, Osborne began his career with amateur club South Ruislip Rangers and spent a period with Queens Park Rangers, before trialling with youth system at Brentford at the age of 15, on the recommendation of Bobby Ross. Osborne embarked on a scholarship at the beginning of the 2004–05 season and progressed sufficiently to be named as a substitute in a youthful squad for a Football League Trophy first round match versus Milton Keynes Dons on 28 September 2004. Osborne remained unused during the 3–0 defeat and was named on the bench on two further occasions, before making his debut on the final day of the 2004–05 regular season versus Hull City. He played the full 90 minutes of the 2–1 comeback victory, but did not appear in the Bees' 2005 League One play-off campaign. Osborne signed a professional contract and made three appearances during the 2005–06 season. He spent the final two months of the season on loan at Conference South club Hayes.

Breakthrough (2006–2009) 
An injury crisis early in 2006–07 season under new manager Leroy Rosenior saw Osborne make regular substitute appearances in youthful matchday squads through the first six weeks of the season, before he broke into the starting lineup at right back in late September 2006. He made 24 appearances during a disastrous season, which ended with Brentford's relegation to League Two. Osborne signed a new two-year contract in June 2007 and made semi-regular appearances during the 2007–08 and 2008–09 League Two seasons.

Though Osborne captained the team on occasion, a lack of confidence meant that he spent periods out of favour with manager Andy Scott, which necessitated spells away on loan at Conference Premier clubs Oxford United and Eastbourne Borough. Osborne scored the first senior goal of his career in a 1–0 win over Shrewsbury Town on 5 January 2008, when he converted a header from a Ryan Dickson corner. He followed up with four further goals during the 2008–09 season, which included a header in a 2–0 victory over Luton Town on the final day, which crowned Brentford's League Two title-winning season and gave Osborne the first silverware of his career.

Final years (2009–2012) 
Back in League One, Osborne began the 2009–10 season out of favour and made sporadic appearances from the bench as cover in central defence and full back. He spurned opportunities to move away on loan and finally broke into the starting lineup in March 2010. After being challenged by manager Andy Scott to hold onto his starting spot, Osborne started in 11 of Brentford's 13 remaining matches of the season and signed a new two-year contract in May 2010. Osborne fully established himself in the team and made a career-high 51 appearances during the 2010–11 season, which featured a run to the 2011 Football League Trophy Final.

Talks over a new three-year contract began in January 2011, which went unresolved after the sacking of manager Andy Scott and the appointment of interim manager Nicky Forster a matter of weeks later. Injury problems meant that Osborne was in and out of the team under new manager Uwe Rösler during the 2011–12 season and he made just 27 appearances. In a U-turn, he rejected a new contract and was released in June 2012. In eight seasons at Griffin Park, Osborne made 185 appearances and scored six goals.

Millwall 
On 13 July 2012, Osborne signed a two-year contract with Championship club Millwall on a two-year contract. He suffered with injury during his first season at The Den and finished 2012–13 with 16 appearances and one goal, which came in a 2–1 defeat to Blackburn Rovers on 23 April 2013. Osborne was surplus to requirements during the early months of the 2013–14 season and made just one appearance before departing the club on loan on 31 October 2013, which was later extended and turned into a permanent deal on 7 January 2014. He made 17 appearances and scored one goal during 18 months with Millwall.

Bristol City (loan and permanent transfer) 
On 31 October 2013, Osborne joined League One club Bristol City on a one-month loan, which was later extended to 5 January 2014. He was signed as cover for injured loanee Lewis Dunk and immediately went into the starting lineup. Despite missing almost a month after incurring a suspension for a red card received at the end of November, Osborne regained his place upon his return and joined the club on a two-and-a-half-year contract for an undisclosed fee on 7 January 2014. He scored his first goal for the Robins against his former club Brentford, in a 3–1 defeat at Griffin Park on 28 January. Osborne remained a regular starter through to the end of the 2013–14 season and finished the campaign with 29 appearances and one goal.

After suffering a "horrific injury" to his shin during the 2014–15 pre-season, Osborne returned to fitness in mid-August 2014, but thereafter was entirely out of favour with manager Steve Cotterill and made just three appearances during the club's League One title-winning season, though he did receive a promotion medal. He did not feature at all in the club's Football League Trophy-winning campaign. On 26 February 2015, Osborne joined League One club Colchester United on loan until the end of the 2014–15 season. He made four appearances before suffering an injury, which led to his recall to Ashton Gate on 4 April 2015.

On 2 July 2015, Osborne joined League Two club AFC Wimbledon on a season-long loan. He was a regular pick until his season was ended by a medial ligament injury suffered in training in February 2016. The injury meant that Osborne sat out the Dons' 2016 victorious League Two play-off campaign, though he received a winners' medal. He made 25 appearances during the 2015–16 season and was released by Bristol City in June 2016, when his contract expired. He made 32 appearances and scored one goal during two-and-a-half seasons with the Robins.

Plymouth Argyle 
On 24 June 2016, Osborne joined League Two club Plymouth Argyle on a free transfer. A thigh injury suffered early during the 2016–17 pre-season kept Osborne out until October 2016 and as manager Derek Adams' fourth-choice central defender, he made just two appearances before being released from his contract on 16 January 2017.

Kilmarnock 
Osborne moved to Scotland to join Premiership club Kilmarnock on a two-year contract on 16 January 2017. Five days later, he made his debut versus Hamilton Academical in the Scottish Cup fourth round and conceded a last-minute penalty, which resulted in a 1–0 defeat. Osborne was substituted due to injury in the following match and would not appear for the club again before his departure in July 2017.

Grimsby Town 
On 26 July 2017, Osborne returned to England to join League Two club Grimsby Town on a one-year contract, with the option of a further year. Aside from a run of starts in January and February 2018, Osborne was barely utilised by manager Russell Slade and was released at the end of the 2017–18 season. He made 13 appearances for the Mariners.

Aldershot Town
On 1 August 2018, Osborne signed a one-year contract with National League club Aldershot Town and was named as captain of the team. Calf, achilles and quad injuries saw him make just 9 appearances before his contract was terminated by mutual consent on 4 February 2019.

Braintree Town
On 1 March 2019, Osborne joined National League strugglers Braintree Town on a free transfer and made just one appearance before the end of the 2018–19 season. He announced his retirement from football in June 2019.

Coaching career 
Osborne has a UEFA B Licence and began his coaching career during the 2015–16 season with Brentford Women. He was appointed to the role of head coach on a permanent basis in July 2018. Prior to the beginning of the 2020–21 season, Osborne was appointed first team coach and defensive strategist at Southern League Premier Division South club Walton Casuals. The club was dissolved in June 2022.

Personal life 
Osborne lives in Isleworth and is an Arsenal supporter. Former Brentford teammate Ryan Peters is godfather to his son.

Career statistics

Honours 
Brentford
 Football League Two: 2008–09

Bristol City

 Football League One: 2014–15

AFC Wimbledon

 Football League Two play-offs: 2016

References

External links
 
Karleigh Osborne at brentfordfc.com

1988 births
Living people
Brentford F.C. players
Oxford United F.C. players
Eastbourne Borough F.C. players
Millwall F.C. players
Bristol City F.C. players
Colchester United F.C. players
Hayes F.C. players
AFC Wimbledon players
Plymouth Argyle F.C. players
Kilmarnock F.C. players
Grimsby Town F.C. players
Braintree Town F.C. players
English footballers
English Football League players
National League (English football) players
Scottish Professional Football League players
People from Southall
Footballers from Southall
Association football central defenders
Association football fullbacks